Brandbergen, is a suburb in Haninge Municipality, Stockholm County, Sweden. It is located 20 km south of Stockholm, and is a residential area built in late 1960s to early 1970s, consisting of more than 6 000 flats, small amount of them are rental flats, some of them are society-owned. Commuting to central Stockholm is facilitated by buses and commuter trains.

Brandbergen is situated only 2 km from Tyresta National Park, a large area with virgin forests.

Populated places in Haninge Municipality